The Welsh Wizard, singular or plural, is a nickname that has been applied to various Welsh people and entities including:

People
Gareth Bale, footballer
Jonny Clayton, darts player
Jonathan Davies (rugby, born 1962), professional rugby union footballer
John Dee, polymath
David Lloyd George, politician who served as Prime Minister of the United Kingdom
Ryan Giggs, footballer
Nicky Grist, rally co-driver
Iestyn Harris, professional rugby league footballer
Billy Meredith, footballer
Darren Morgan, snooker player
Andrew Pagett, snooker player
Aaron Ramsey, footballer
Twm Siôn Cati, figure in Welsh folklore
Freddie Welsh, boxer
Howard Winstone, boxer

Organisations
Aberavon RFC (est. 1876), rugby union club termed "The Welsh Wizards" among similar nicknames

See also
Welsh mythology, for various mythological wizards associated with Wales

Nicknames in sports
Nicknames in association football
Nicknames in boxing